Rufayda Al-Aslamia (also transliterated Rufaida Al-Aslamiya or Rufaydah bint Sa`ad) (born approx. 620 AD; 2 BH), was an Islamic medical and social worker recognized as the first female Muslim nurse and the first female surgeon in Islam. She is known as the first nurse in the world.

Childhood

Personal background
Among the first people in Madina to accept Islam, Rufaida Al-Aslamia was born into the Bani Aslem tribe of the Kazraj tribal confederation in Madina, and  gained fame for her contribution with other Ansar women who welcomed the Islamic prophet, Muhammad, on arrival in Madina.

Rufaida Al-Aslamia is depicted as a kind, empathetic nurse and a good organizer. With her clinical skills, she trained other women, Including the famous female companions of Muhammad, Ayesha, to be nurses and to work in the area of health care. She also worked as a social worker, helping to solve social problems associated with the disease. In addition, she assisted children in need and took in orphans, and helped the poor.

Familial ties to medicine
Born into a family with strong ties to the medical community, Rufaida's father, Sa`ad Al Aslamy, was a physician and mentor under whom Rufaida initially obtained clinical experience.
 Although not given responsibilities held solely by men such as surgeries and amputations, Rufaida Al-Aslamia practiced her skills in field hospitals in her tent during many battles as Muhammad used to order all casualties to be carried to her tent so that she might treat them with medical expertise. It has also been documented that Rufaida provided care to injured soldiers during the jihad, as well as providing shelter from the wind and heat of the harsh desert for the dying.

Historical aspects of female nursing in Arabia

Pre-Islamic and Islamic Era (570–632 AD)
Typically presented within the context of Muhammad, the historical development of female nursing and surgery in Arabia from the Islamic Period to the modern times boasts a tumultuous history laden with cultural barriers and public pressures. Though very sparse documentation exists about the history of nursing in the Pre-Islamic period, a proper understanding of societal and religious paradigms during the reign of Muhammad lends significant insight into the roles and expectation of nurses in antiquity. In marked contrast to the pervading Christian interpretation of disease as a divine punishment for man, Muslims place an extremely high value on the ritual cleansing of the body, daily prayer schedules, and strict dietary regiments. An era in history defined by several holy wars, medicinal treatment during the times of Muhammad was largely performed solely by doctors, who would personally visit the patient to diagnose abnormalities and provide medications to those who were in need. Placing the bulk of the biological and physiological responsibilities of a patient on the doctor alone, nurses were limited in their duties to providing physical comfort and emotional support.

Post-Prophetic to Middle Ages Era (632–1500 AD)
With the diminishing intensity of holy wars and mass civil unrest that defined the climate of Islamic culture during the reign of Muhammad, advancements in technology and architecture resulted in the construction of many new hospitals and methods for treating the sick. Though nurses in this period were still relegated to rudimentary and noninvasive duties like serving food to patients and administering medicinal liquids, religious and social norms of the times necessitated the segregation of hospital wards based on gender, with males treating males and females treating females. While there has been some relaxation of segregation in contemporary times, the values of many traditional Islamic people are for hospitals and their policies to reflect these past segregational practices.

Revolutions in nursing development

Rufaida Al-Aslamia's emergence as nursing leader
A charismatic and capable leader, published records testify that Rufaida Al-Aslamia, who practiced at the time of Muhammad, was the first Muslim nurse. While there is slight controversy in who is "technically" the first surgeon and nurse in history, Middle Eastern countries attribute the status of the first-ever nurse to Rufaida, a Muslim surgeon and nurse.

Acute care origins
Rufaida Al-Aslamia implemented her clinical skills and medical experience into developing the first-ever documented mobile care units that were able to meet the medical needs of the community. The scope of the majority of her work in her organized medical command units consisted primarily in hygiene and stabilizing patients before further and more invasive medical procedures. During military expeditions, Rufaida Al-Aslamia led groups of volunteer nurses who went to the battlefield and treated the casualties. She participated in the battles of Khandaq, Khaibar, and others.

During times of peace, Rufaida Al-Aslamia continued her involvement with humanitarian efforts by providing assistance to Muslims who were in need.

Legacy
Rufaidah had trained a group of women companions as nurses. When prophet Muhammad's army was getting ready to go to the battle of Khaibar, Rufaidah and the group of volunteer nurses went to Muhammad. They asked him for permission "O Messenger of Allah, we want to go out with you to the battle and treat the injured and help Muslims as much as we can". Muhammad permitted them to go. The nurse volunteers did such a good job that Muhammad assigned a share of the bounty to Rufaidah. Her share was equivalent to that of soldiers who had fought. This was in recognition of her medical and nursing work.

Rufaidah Al-Aslamia Prize In Nursing
Each year the Royal College of Surgeons in Ireland at the University of Bahrain  awards one student the coveted and prestigious Rufaida Al-Aslamia Prize in Nursing. The award winner determined by a panel of senior clinical medical staff members, the Rufaida Al-Aslamia Prize in Nursing is given to the student who consistently excels in delivering superb nursing care to patients.

References

620s births
Year of birth uncertain
Women companions of the Prophet
Female wartime nurses
Physicians of the medieval Islamic world
Medieval women physicians
7th-century physicians
Women in medieval warfare
Arab women
7th-century Arabs
Women in war in the Middle East
Arab women in war